211th Regional Support Group is a United States Army Reserve unit which controls Combat Sustainment Support Battalion units within Texas.

Units
The brigade is made up of the following units:
 310th Transportation Detachment]] (Petrol Liaison) 
 319th Combat Sustainment Support Battalion
 319th Headquarters and Headquarters Company (Combat Sustainment Support)  
 812th Transportation Company (Support)
 961st Transportation Company (Water Purification & Distribution) 
 370th Transportation Company (Medium Truck)(Palletized Load System)
 971st Transportation Detachment (Tactical Water Distribution) (Hoseline) 
 597th Transportation Detachment (Trailer Transfer Platoon) 
 519th Transportation Detachment (Trailer Transfer Platoon) 
 851st Transportation Company (Medium Truck)(Palletized Load System) 
 373rd Combat Sustainment Support Battalion
 373rd Headquarters and Headquarters Company Battalion (Combat Sustainment Support)
 242nd Transportation Company (Field Services)(Mission Operations Directorate)
 288th Transportation Company (Water Purification & Distribution)
 331st Technical Manager Petrol (Quality Assurance)
 1002nd Transportation Company (Petrol P/L&TML OP)
 79th Transportation Company (Support)
 103rd Transportation Company (Support)

References

Support groups of the United States Army